Zev Yaroslavsky (born December 21, 1948) is a politician from Los Angeles County, California. He was a member of the Los Angeles County Board of Supervisors from District 3, which includes the San Fernando Valley, the Westside of Los Angeles and coastal areas between Venice and the Ventura County line. He was first elected to the board in 1994.

Yaroslavsky served on the Los Angeles City Council from 1975 to 1994. He was active in the fields of transportation, the environment, health care, and cultural affairs.

Biography

Family

Zev Yaroslavsky, the son of David and Minna Yaroslavsky, was born on December 21, 1948, in Los Angeles. He and his older sister, Shimona (married name: Kushner), were the children of Jewish immigrants from the Russian Empire and grew up in a Zionist household in Boyle Heights. His father was a founder of the Hebrew Teachers Union in Los Angeles, and both parents, who were born in Ukraine, were founders of North American Habonim, a Labor Zionist youth movement. Yaroslavsky recalled that his parents spoke to their children only in Hebrew to prepare them for emigrating to Israel.  Yaroslavsky's visited Israel when Shimona was thirteen and Zev was five. Shimona later emigrated permanently.

Yaroslavsky was married to the former Barbara Edelston (1947–2018), whom he met as a student at UCLA. In 1985, while Yaroslavsky was a City Council member, a newspaper reporter noted Yaroslavsky's frugality when describing their home in the Fairfax District as "a drab yellow structure with peeling paint and a dirt-patched front lawn." The reporter noted that Yaroslavsky was known for frugality in his public and private life, spending much of his spare time following world events in newspapers and on television. Barbara Yaroslavsky was first appointed to the Medical Board of California in 2003, and subsequently served multiple terms as its President. The couple had two children, a son named David and daughter Mina. Their son David is a Los Angeles Superior Court judge. David's wife and Zev's daughter in law, Katy, was elected to the Los Angeles City Council in 2022.

Education

Yaroslavsky attended Melrose Avenue Elementary School, Bancroft Junior High School and Fairfax High School. He earned a Bachelor of Arts in history and economics from UCLA in 1971 and a Master of Arts in history, specializing in the British Empire, from the same school in 1972. Afterward, he taught Hebrew at temples in Pasadena and Bel Air.

Early activism

Yaroslavsky first gained public notice as a UCLA student who had begun orchestrating high-profile protests in Los Angeles against oppressive treatment of Jews in the Soviet Union. After a revelatory trip to visit relatives in Russia, he formed the California Students for Soviet Jews, which, as its first major action, picketed Soviet athletes in town for a track and field event at the Coliseum. Although a self-described "flaming liberal" at the time, Yaroslavsky recruited conservative TV newsman and commentator George Putnam, who, Yaroslavsky said, "was anti-Soviet and very favorable to Soviet Jews." In December, 1969, they organized a candlelight protest march that would attract more than 5,000 people, including then-Mayor Sam Yorty and television performer Steve Allen.

In 1971, as executive director of the Southern California Council on Soviet Jewry, Yaroslavsky made news again when he led protests against the Bolshoi Ballet and boated into Los Angeles Harbor to paint "Let My People Go" on the side of a Soviet freighter. He was arrested during one Bolshoi protest but no charges were filed. He also was "deeply involved" in a campaign to burn Standard Oil credit cards after the company sent a letter to 300,000 stockholders that appeared to support a pro-Arab Middle East policy. He resigned from that $150-a-week job to campaign for the City Council.

City Council

Elections

Yaroslavsky's 1975 election to the City Council's 5th District on Los Angeles' Westside stunned the city's political establishment, which had supported his opponent, Frances M. Savitch, a former aide to then-Mayor Tom Bradley. Savitch had secured endorsements from, among others, California's two U.S. senators, members of Congress and an assortment of state office holders—"some of the strongest political muscle ever assembled in a City Council race," as the Los Angeles Times put it in a post-election analysis.  In the primary, Yaroslavsky ran second to Savitch, eliminating from the race Rosalind Wiener Wyman, who was seeking to retake the seat she held from 1953 to 1965. Wyman endorsed Yaroslavsky in his grass-roots general election campaign. When Yaroslavsky was sworn in as the council's then-youngest member at age 26, Mayor Bradley quipped: "Congratulations. Now you're part of the establishment." "Yes," Yaroslavsky recalled retorting, "but the establishment is not part of me."

During his tenure, Yaroslavsky served as chairman of two of the council's most powerful committees—one that oversaw the city's budget and finances, the other that oversaw the Los Angeles Police Department. He had a reputation among his colleagues as driven, ambitious and bright, someone who "knows the value of…good box office issues." Like his predecessor, Edmund D. Edelman, Yaroslavsky vacated his seat early, after his successful election to the Los Angeles County Board of Supervisors. In a 1994 story marking his first day as a supervisor, the Los Angeles Times noted that "Yaroslavsky was more often than not a dominant player in virtually every municipal initiative of note since he joined the City Council in 1975."

Positions

Land use and the environment

Soon after his election, Yaroslavsky began confronting development and traffic issues across his Westside district, which included such communities as Bel Air, Westwood, Fairfax and Pico-Robertson. Among other things, he successfully obtained ordinances that reduced neighborhood building heights and imposed severe restrictions on hillside development. Yaroslavsky also led an effort to substantially limit the scale of development in Century City, once envisioned by developers as a "mini Manhattan." Yaroslavsky was credited with orchestrating the negotiations concerning the use, for the first time, of potential traffic congestion measurements to help determine the scope of a project.
In 1984, Yaroslavsky suffered a stinging setback when the Los Angeles City Council voted 8–7 to reject his proposed moratorium on high-rises along Wilshire Boulevard, a proposal that had turned the heavily-traveled thoroughfare into a "political battleground."  Yaroslavsky said the defeat—which he blamed on council colleagues who reneged on promises to vote for the measure—left him angry and committed to taking his "slow-growth" message to voters. In 1986, Yaroslavsky and Los Angeles City Councilman Marvin Braude authored a ballot initiative, Proposition U, that the Los Angeles Times called "the largest one-shot effort to limit development in the city's history." The measure proposed to cut in half the size of new buildings allowed on more than 70% of the city's commercial and industrial property. Critics, including labor and business leaders, predicted that Prop. U would discourage investment in L.A. and reduce jobs, particularly in economically-depressed minority neighborhoods. But the measure passed by a margin of more than 2-to-1 and was hailed by supporters as representing the "dawn of a new era" in managing Los Angeles' growth.

The following year, Yaroslavsky and Braude teamed up again, this time to gather signatures for a ballot initiative that would block Occidental Petroleum Corp.'s decades-long effort to drill for oil in the Pacific Palisades along the city's shoreline. The controversial Proposition O would ban future drilling 1,000 yards inland of the mean high tide line. While environmentalists lined up behind the measure, opponents derided it as "an elitist cause" that would deprive the city of between $100 million and $200 million in taxes, royalties and license fees. Mayor Tom Bradley said the measure was unnecessary given safety precautions Occidental had proposed to prevent an accident. In November 1988, voters narrowly approved Proposition O, bringing to a close what was then the most expensive electoral campaign in the city's history.

These back-to-back victories heightened Yaroslavsky's profile and positioned him as the top challenger to Bradley, whose popularity had begun to erode. But in early 1988, as the councilman was preparing a potential mayoral bid, his "slow-growth" credentials came under harsh scrutiny in a lengthy Los Angeles Times story headlined, "The Two Sides of Zev Yaroslavsky." While the piece praised Yaroslavsky's growth-control record in Century City and elsewhere, it accused him of quietly taking actions on behalf of some projects that he had publicly criticized, including the Westside Pavilion mall and two buildings that would have been blocked under his ill-fated Wilshire Boulevard construction moratorium. The story also noted that Yaroslavsky received strong financial support from major developers. In response, Yaroslavsky suggested that compromise was sometimes necessary to achieve positive outcomes on individual projects. "I lead a dual life," he told the newspaper. "I have to deal with the practical, day-to-day monotony of negotiations between contesting parties. . . . I can't lock myself in a closet and say, 'I'm a crusader.' " In January, 1989, Yaroslavsky announced that he would not challenge Bradley, calling the four-term mayor a "very popular and entrenched incumbent" who would be "virtually impossible" to beat.

Los Angeles Police Department

During the late 1970s and early 1980s, Yaroslavsky emerged as the leading critic of the Los Angeles Police Department's controversial intelligence-gathering practices. In an open challenge to then-Chief Daryl F. Gates, Yaroslavsky accused the department's Public Disorder Intelligence Division of spying on some 200 law-abiding individuals and groups. The unit was disbanded in early 1983 amid mounting disclosures that the department had not only been spying on critics and left-learning groups, but also had been secretly storing intelligence files in the home and garage of a detective. Those documents included files on Yaroslavsky and then-Mayor Tom Bradley. A confidential report by three top Los Angeles police officials concluded, among other things, that the unit was riddled with management problems and was plagued by attitudes rooted in the past. The ensuing outcry set the stage for Yaroslavsky to prevail in his five-year effort to win passage of a local freedom of information act, which was strongly opposed by police officials who argued that it would be "stupid" to tell a potential "terrorist" whether the department had a file on him. One assistant chief accused the councilman of a "lack of integrity." Although the council majority weakened the final ordinance under pressure from the department, Yaroslavsky and the American Civil Liberties Union, which had sued the LAPD, proclaimed victory nonetheless. "It's not as strong as I wanted it to be," Yaroslavsky said, "but it could have been a lot weaker." The ACLU suit was settled in 1984, with the City of Los Angeles agreeing to pay $1.8 million to 131 plaintiffs and to establish more rigorous controls over future intelligence-gathering activities.

As chairman of the council's powerful Police, Fire and Public Safety Committee, Yaroslavsky also was highly critical of the LAPD's use of choke holds, which had been linked to more than a dozen deaths of suspects in Los Angeles police custody during a three-year period in the early 1980s. Yaroslavsky and his committee initially negotiated new guidelines for use of the technique, aimed at subduing suspects by either choking off air supply or blocking the flow of blood to the brain, causing unconsciousness.  But by the end of 1982, with controversy continuing, Yaroslavsky argued that a moratorium on chokeholds imposed by the civilian Police Commission should be made permanent.

Other

RFK assassination, 1975. Yaroslavsky submitted a successful resolution to the council creating an ad hoc investigative group that was to review the police and other official investigations into the assassination of Senator Robert F. Kennedy in 1968.

Bakery prices, 1977. He offered a resolution that would have required bakeries to post the prices of their goods.

Olympics, 1978. Yaroslavsky and Councilman Bob Ronka were known as the "most active . . . skeptics" in working to protect the city from potentially incurring "massive security costs" that the two believed should be shouldered by the private Los Angeles Olympic Organizing Committee in staging the 1984 Olympic Games.

Skokie. As a councilman, Yaroslavsky announced that he would go to Skokie, Illinois, in June 1978 to attend a rally protesting a planned march by American Nazis through the heavily Jewish Chicago suburb. He called the march "an insidious provocation which should shock the conscience of every American."

Council feud, 1981. Yaroslavsky successfully worked to unseat long-time council President John Ferraro. Both men were potential mayoral candidates. Ferraro purportedly struck back by engineering the election of Councilman Joel Wachs to the council presidency over Yaroslavsky's favored candidate, Councilwoman Pat Russell.[5]  "Mr. Ferraro's actions show the small measure of the man," Yaroslavsky said. Ferraro said of Yaroslavsky: "I think he's childish, desperate…immature." The conflict over the demolition was emblematic of a deeper political rift between the two men that was roiling the entire council. As one said, "somebody has got to bring these guys together again."

Breaking with tradition, 1985. Yaroslavsky broke with City Council tradition when he campaigned for challenger Michael Woo against pro-growth fellow council member Peggy Stevenson, who had helped defeat a controversial building moratorium planned for part of Yaroslavsky's district. Councilman Dave Cunningham called that an act of "back stabbing." But Yaroslavsky dismissed Cunningham and other critics as "the same ones who have been sticking it to the Westside for 25 years."

Board of Supervisors

Yaroslavsky represented the Third Supervisorial District of Los Angeles County, which encompasses the cities of Malibu, Santa Monica, West Hollywood, Calabasas, as well as most of the western San Fernando Valley and other portions of the City of Los Angeles.

Elections

Yaroslavsky won his first term on the Los Angeles County Board of Superviors when Edmund D. Edelman did not seek re-election in 1994.  In his 2006 re-election race he ran against David Hernandez, a Republican and retired insurance adjuster who campaigned to keep the cross on the Los Angeles County Seal, and Randy Springer.  Yaroslavsky won the election, receiving 70.49% of the vote in the primary. Yaroslavsky was elected to a fifth term in 2010, running unopposed. As a result of term limits, Yaroslavsky left the Board of Supervisors in December 2014 and did not run for mayor as was predicted.

Positions

Land use and the environment

Yaroslavsky was a longtime environmental advocate, most notably in restricting development and preserving open space in the Santa Monica Mountains. Since he joined the Board of Supervisors in 1994, he helped acquire 7,870 acres of county parkland through bonds and matching funds. In 2004, Yaroslavsky helped craft a controversial ordinance that made it more difficult to develop scenic ridge lines in the Santa Monica Mountains, while also cutting in half the amount of grading allowed without a conditional use permit. This reversed the extensive development policies of county leaders in the 1980s and early 1990s. Opponents denounced the ordinance as an arbitrary and unrealistic "land grab." But it had the backing of the board majority, the National Park Service and the California Department of Parks and Recreation, among others.

The following year, Yaroslavsky was credited with being the key to finalizing a complex $35-million deal to preserve a 588-acre swath of "mostly pristine woodlands" in the Santa Monica Mountains for use as parkland. The Los Angeles Times called the protection and purchase of the land from Soka University a "major environmental achievement," noting that Yaroslavsky and others had worked for months to bring together a coalition of agencies and residents to find the purchase money. The historic property—named King Gillette Ranch after the razor blade tycoon who once owned the land—is now open to the public.

Transportation

As a county supervisor, Yaroslavsky sat on the board of directors of the Metropolitan Transportation Authority. In 1998, citing concerns about the MTA's mounting internal problems, growing debt and myriad subway construction mishaps and cost overruns, Yaroslavsky sponsored a controversial ballot initiative, Proposition A, to prevent transit sales tax monies from being used to build underground rail lines. Yaroslavsky argued that mass transit could be achieved less expensively and more efficiently through light-rail and dedicated busways than through subways at a cost of $300 million per mile. Critics portrayed Proposition A as too extreme and argued that it would prevent subways from coming to the county's minority neighborhoods. But county voters, including those in heavily minority areas, overwhelmingly supported Yaroslasky's MTA Reform and Accountability Act. In the meantime, Yaroslavsky pushed for a 14-mile dedicated busway that would cut through the San Fernando Valley on paved right-of-ways. It was nicknamed the "Napkin Line" because Yaroslavsky drew the route on a Varig napkin while flying home from studying a similar system in Curitiba, Brazil. Officially called the "Orange Line," the $350-million busway began service in 2005 and soon achieved ridership numbers that far exceeded planners' predictions and led to better freeway commute times. "This is one of Metro's greatest success stories," the agency's deputy CEO said.

Money was restored to subway construction and other major transit projects in 2008, when county voters approved a half-cent sales tax measure promoted by Yaroslavsky and Los Angeles Mayor Antonio Villaraigosa. Measure R is expected to generate $40 billion over 30 years. The measure detailed specific rail and highway projects that will be undertaken, including the Purple Line subway on the Westside and the Expo Line, a light rail project backed by Yaroslavsky that begins in Downtown Los Angeles and will end in Santa Monica when completed in 2017. The supervisor was also an early proponent of easing Westside traffic by converting Pico and Olympic Boulevards into complementary one-way thoroughfares.

Health care

In 2002, Yaroslavsky authored a ballot initiative to raise $168 million annually in an effort to avert the potential collapse of Los Angeles County's vast emergency and trauma-care network, which was threatened by a deep health-care budget deficit. Measure B passed with a surprising 73 percent of the vote, marking the first time since the 1978 passage of tax-slashing Proposition 13 that county voters had approved a direct tax on their property. As a result, the county was able to avoid the possible closure of two public hospitals while keeping emergency and trauma-care services afloat.

Yaroslavsky, a former smoker, also has been acknowledged for playing a key role in the county's anti-tobacco efforts. In 1996, he successfully pressed the county to sue six tobacco companies to recover hundreds of millions of dollars in health-care costs from smoking-related illnesses. He accused the companies of specifically marketing to poor people, immigrants and teenagers who turn to county hospitals and clinics for treatment.  Four years later, as part of a statewide settlement of tobacco litigation, the county received a $79 million payment, the first to be made annually for 25 years. In all, Los Angeles County was expected to receive nearly $3 billion as result of the litigation.

In 2001, Yaroslavsky was diagnosed with Type 2 diabetes. Although a longtime daily runner, he immediately changed his diet and lifestyle, reducing his weight from 215 pounds to 185 in 2008. Yaroslavsky said the diagnosis led to his successful sponsorship of an ordinance that now requires all fast-food outlets in unincorporated Los Angeles County areas to post calorie counts on their menus.

Yaroslavsky also is credited with bringing health care to a largely working-class Latino neighborhood in the northeastern San Fernando Valley by providing services through an innovative clinic built on the campus of the local Sun Valley Middle School. The clinic serves an area where many residents are uninsured, living below the poverty line and rarely seek medical attention. The county appropriated $7.5 million for construction costs.

Yaroslavsky and his four colleagues on the Board of Supervisors came under sharp criticism in a Pulitzer Prize-winning 2004 series by the Los Angeles Times on massive and deadly problems inside Martin Luther King Jr./Drew Medical Center in South Los Angeles, a county hospital built after the 1965 Watts Riots to serve the area's then-largely African-American population. Current and previous supervisors were accused of failing to take action for decades because of internal board politics and fear of an angry backlash from some African-American community leaders who strongly supported the hospital, despite its documented problems. After the series was published, in-patient services were shut down. County efforts to reopen the facility floundered for nearly two years until Yaroslavsky proposed a "last, best hope" partnership with the University of California, which he first outlined in an Op-Ed piece in the Los Angeles Times. An accord was reached with the UC in 2009. An editorial in The Times said Yaroslavsky had "demonstrated the value of experience and political astuteness."

Homelessness

With Los Angeles known as the nation's homeless capital, Yaroslavsky created a county pilot program in 2008 called Project 50, aimed at identifying and then providing permanent supportive housing to the 50 people most likely to die on the streets of L.A.'s Skid Row. Funded with a county grant of $3 million, the program was based on the premise that public funds are more effectively and humanely spent by providing chronically homeless people with housing, medical care and social services than by relying on costly jails and emergency rooms. This approach was pioneered by the New York-based group Common Ground.

Project 50 has been criticized by some of Yaroslavsky's colleagues on the Board of Supervisors and others for not requiring participants to achieve sobriety before they're permanently housed with public funds. In 2009, the board majority resisted the program's broader, countywide implementation. "Warehousing without healing," is how one described Project 50 in a Los Angeles Times series that raised questions about the program's effectiveness. But Los Angeles Times columnist Steve Lopez, whose relationship with a homeless violinist became the basis of the movie "The Soloist," studied the program and concluded that "for the most part the results have been remarkable."

Encouraged by Project 50's results, the U.S. Department of Veterans Affairs has created Project 60, using the same methods to help homeless veterans in Los Angeles. Project 50 itself has been replicated throughout Yaroslavsky's Third Supervisorial District, including in such areas as Santa Monica, Hollywood and Venice. In 2012, acting on a motion by Supervisor Yaroslavsky and Supervisor Mark Ridley-Thomas, the Board of Supervisors unanimously voted to create the county's first interdepartmental council on homelessness. As chairman of the Board of Supervisors, Yaroslavsky acts as the new panel's first chair. The council has been directed to expand previously successful but modestly-sized programs such as Project 50 and Access to Housing for Health.

Arts and culture
Yaroslavsky has been instrumental in securing millions of dollars in funding for the arts in Los Angeles County. In 1996, he introduced a bond measure designed to improve parks, buy open space and provide new recreational facilities. It passed with 65% of the vote. Among other things, Proposition A set aside millions of dollars to remake the iconic shell at the Hollywood Bowl. Yaroslavsky appropriated an additional nearly $7 million from the Third District capital and maintenance fund to replace the deteriorating 1929 shell, which angry preservationists had sought but failed to save during a two-year court battle. The new shell—praised by members of the Los Angeles Philharmonic for its acoustics and larger size—was unveiled in June, 2004.

Yaroslavsky played a key role among local elected officials in the construction of the Walt Disney Concert Hall in downtown Los Angeles. He appropriated $1 million to help build architect Frank Gehry's distinctive hall, which opened in 2003. In 2007, Yaroslavsky appropriated $2 million from the Third District's capital projects budget for the construction of a landmark concert venue in the San Fernando Valley, predicting that it would revitalize the underserved region as Disney Concert Hall had done in downtown Los Angeles. Located on the campus of California State University, Northridge, the Valley Performing Arts Center opened in January, 2011.

He has been a supporter of the Los Angeles Opera, conducting the national anthem at the 2014 performance of La Traviata at the Dorothy Chandler Pavilion, directed Marta Domingo.

Explaining his arts advocacy, Yaroslavsky told the Los Angeles Times: "Even if you don't like ballet or classical music or opera, it's an economic engine, it puts people to work, and it pays well."

See also 
 History of the Jews in Los Angeles

References

NOTE: Access to some Los Angeles Times and Los Angeles Daily News reference links may require the use of a library card or fee.

External links
 Official Los Angeles County District 3 website — with portrait photo.
 Newsmeat Congressional Campaign Contributors List

Documentary
 Yaroslavsky was interviewed in the 2007 documentary Refusenik.

Politicians from Los Angeles
California Democrats
Los Angeles City Council members
Los Angeles County Board of Supervisors
1948 births
Living people
People from Boyle Heights, Los Angeles
Fairfax High School (Los Angeles) alumni
University of California, Los Angeles alumni
American people of Ukrainian-Jewish descent
Jewish American community activists
Activists from California
21st-century American Jews